Catching the Sun is the third album by the American jazz group Spyro Gyra, released in 1980 on MCA Records. The album was given gold status by the RIAA on June 5, 1985.

At Billboard magazine, Catching the Sun reached No. 19 on the Top 200 albums chart. The song "Catching the Sun" reached No. 15 on the Adult Contemporary singles chart and No. 68 on the Hot 100 singles chart. The song "Percolator" peaked at No. 48 on the Adult Contemporary singles chart.  In Canada, the album reached No. 80 in the Top 100 Album chart.

Track listing and personnel 
 "Catching the Sun" (Jay Beckenstein) – 4:42
 Jay Beckenstein – alto saxophone, Fender Rhodes
 Tom Schuman – Fender Rhodes, synthesizers
 Jeremy Wall – synthesizers, effects
 Hiram Bullock – acoustic and electric guitars
 Chet Catallo – electric guitar solos
 John Tropea – electric rhythm guitar
 Jim Kurzdorfer – bass guitar
 Eli Konikoff – drums
 Gerardo Velez – percussion
 Dave Samuels – marimba, steel drums
 Rubens Bassini – congas, percussion
 Randy Brecker – trumpet solo
 "Cockatoo" (all members) – 4:04
 Jay Beckenstein – tenor saxophone, percussion
 Tom Schuman – Fender Rhodes, synthesizer solos
 Chet Catallo – electric rhythm guitar
 Will Lee – bass guitar
 Eli Konikoff – drums
 Gerardo Velez – percussion, bongos
 Jeremy Wall – percussion
 Richard Calandra – percussion
 Randy Brecker – trumpet solo
 "Autumn of Our Love" (Jeremy Wall) – 5:09
 Jay Beckenstein – alto and soprano saxophones
 Tom Schuman – Fender Rhodes
 Jeremy Wall – synthesizers
 Chet Catallo – electric rhythm guitar
 John Tropea – acoustic guitar, electric guitar solo
 Jim Kurzdorfer – bass guitar
 Eli Konikoff – drums
 Rubens Bassini – congas
 "Laser Material" (Tom Schuman) – 4:59
 Jay Beckenstein – soprano saxophone
 Tom Schuman – Fender Rhodes, synthesizers, effects, synthesizer programming 
 Steve Nathan – clavinet, synthesizer programming
 Jeremy Wall – synthesizer programming
 Chet Catallo – electric rhythm guitar
 John Tropea – electric rhythm guitar and guitar solo 
 Will Lee – bass guitar
 Eli Konikoff – drums
 Gerardo Velez – percussion
 Richard Calandra – tambourine
 Dave Samuels – marimba
 Randy Brecker – trumpet solo
 "Percolator" (Jay Beckenstein) – 2:28
 Jay Beckenstein – alto saxophone
 Tom Schuman – Fender Rhodes, synthesizers
 Hiram Bullock – lead guitar and electric rhythm guitar
 Chet Catallo – electric guitar
 Will Lee – bass guitar
 Eli Konikoff – drums
 Gerardo Velez – percussion
 Dave Samuels – marimba, vibraphone
 Rubens Bassini – percussion
 "Philly" (Jim Kurzdorfer) 4:18
 Jay Beckenstein – alto saxophone
 Tom Schuman – Fender Rhodes, acoustic piano, synthesizers
 Chet Catallo – electric guitar solo
 John Tropea – rhythm guitar
 Jim Kurzdorfer – bass guitar
 Eli Konikoff – drums
 Rubens Bassini – congas
 Barry Rogers – trombone solo
 "Lovin' You/Lovin' You (for Christine) (Chet Catallo)" – 4:41
 Jay Beckenstein – alto saxophone, synthesizer
 Tom Schuman – Fender Rhodes, synthesizer solo
 Jeremy Wall – string synthesizer
 Chet Catallo – electric guitars
 Will Lee – bass guitar
 Eli Konikoff – drums
 Rubens Bassini – percussion
 "Here Again" (Jay Beckenstein) – 4:56
 Jay Beckenstein – soprano saxophone
 Tom Schuman – Fender Rhodes, acoustic piano
 Jeremy Wall – synthesizers
 Chet Catallo – electric guitars
 John Tropea – acoustic guitar
 Jim Kurzdorfer – bass guitar
 Eli Konikoff – drums
 Gerardo Velez – bongos, percussion
 Dave Samuels – vibraphone
 Rubens Bassini – congas, percussion
 "Safari" (Jeremy Wall) – (4:52)
 Jay Beckenstein – alto saxophone
 Tom Schuman – Fender Rhodes, synthesizer solo
 Jeremy Wall – synthesizers
 Hiram Bullock – guitars
 Will Lee – bass guitar
 Eli Konikoff – drums
 Gerardo Velez – percussion
 Dave Samuels – marimba
 Rubens Bassini – congas, percussion
 Barry Rogers – trombone solo

Horn Section on "Laser Material"
 Jeremy Wall – horn arrangements
 Jay Beckenstein – alto saxophone, horn arrangements 
 Bob Malach – tenor saxophone 
 Tom Malone – trombone 
 Randy Brecker – trumpet

String Section on "Laser Material"
 Jeremy Wall – string arrangements and conductor 
 Harry Lookofsky – concertmaster 
 Charles McCracken, Jesse Levy and Alan Shulman – cello
 Peter Dimitriades, Lewis Eley, Harold Kohon, Charles Libove, Harry Lookofsky, David Nadien, Matthew Raimondi and Richard Sortomme – violin

Production 
 Jay Beckenstein – producer 
 Richard Calandra – producer
 Jeremy Wall – assistant producer 
 Michael Barry – engineer 
 Jack Malken – engineer
 Jason Corsaro – assistant engineer
 Bob Ludwig – mastering at Masterdisk (New York, NY).
 Peter Corriston – art direction, design 
 David Heffernan – illustration

Charts

External links
 Spyro Gyra official website

References

1980 albums
Jazz fusion albums by American artists
Spyro Gyra albums
MCA Records albums